William J. Lane (February 7, 1905 – July 1976) was a Democratic member of the Pennsylvania State Senate.

He was first elected to represent the 46th senatorial district in the Pennsylvania Senate in a special election on May 21, 1946. He held that position until 1970.

External links

References

Democratic Party Pennsylvania state senators
1905 births
1976 deaths
20th-century American politicians
People from Brownsville, Pennsylvania